Alexandre Picard may refer to:

Alexandre R. Picard (born 1985), hockey defencemen originally drafted by the Philadelphia Flyers of the NHL
Alexandre Picard (ice hockey) (born 1985), hockey left winger originally drafted by the Columbus Blue Jackets of the NHL